Space Groove is the first and only studio album recorded by ProjeKct Two, a King Crimson fraKctal group. The album was recorded at Studio Belewbeloible during November 19 to November 21, 1997.

Track listing

Personnel
 Adrian Belew – drums
 Robert Fripp – guitar
 Trey Gunn – touch guitar, synth
 Ronan Chris Murphy – mixing

References

ProjeKcts
1998 live albums